Staroyanzigitovo (İśke Yänyeget) is a rural locality (a selo) in Novoyanzigitovsky Selsoviet, Krasnokamsky District, Bashkortostan, Russia. The population was 529 as of 2010. There are 11 streets.

Geography 
Staroyanzigitovo is located 51 km south of Nikolo-Beryozovka (the district's administrative centre) by road. Bachkitau is the nearest rural locality.

References 

Rural localities in Krasnokamsky District